Alegria, officially the Municipality of Alegria (Surigaonon: Lungsod nan Alegria;), is a 5th class municipality in the province of Surigao del Norte, Philippines. According to the 2020 census, it has a population of 16,184 people.

History
Alegria was created by Republic Act No. 5239. It was originally the sitio of Anahaw founded by immigrants from the municipality of Bacuag. Sitio Anahaw was situated near Lake Mainit, and would often be flooded due to heavy rains. During rainy seasons, the local families transferred to a place now called Alegria.

The name Alegria was derived from the Spanish word which means "lively". Its name was given by Judge Sixto Olga who happened to spend a night in the place. The people offered him a party dance. Because their affair was lively he told the people to change the name Anahaw to Alegria.

Alegria became a barrio in 1927. It was formerly one of the biggest barrios in the municipality of Mainit. The municipality extends from the boundary of Kitcharao, Agusan del Norte, to Pungtod and Dayano that is the boundary of the mother municipality of Mainit.

Geography

Barangays
Alegria is politically subdivided into 12 barangays.
 Alipao 
 Anahaw 
 Budlingin 
 Camp Eduard (Geotina) 
 Ferlda 
 Gamuton 
Julio Ouano (Poblacion)
 Ombong 
 Poblacion (Alegria)
 Pongtud 
 San Juan 
 San Pedro

Climate

Demographics

The Surigaonon language is the common local language, while Cebuano, Filipino, and English are also spoken.

Economy

Transport

Railway station (proposed)
There are plans for a Mindanao railway network with a railway station in Alegria which would be an intermediate station on a branch line between Surigao and Davao

Education
The following are schools in the center of Alegria: 
Alegria Central Elementary School 
Alegria National High School 
Global Competency Based Training Center 
Marajaw na Magbalantay Learning Center
Alegria Stand Alone Senior High School

See also
 Lake Mainit Development Alliance

References

External links
 Alegria Profile at PhilAtlas.com
   Alegria Profile at the DTI Cities and Municipalities Competitive Index
 [ Philippine Standard Geographic Code]
 Philippine Census Information
 Local Governance Performance Management System

Municipalities of Surigao del Norte
Populated places on Lake Mainit